Andreina Gómez (born April 18, 1981) is a Venezuelan filmmaker, ethnologist, and founder of Salinas Producciones C.A. Her documentaries feature cultural and ethnological themes discovered in her research, with her major work focusing on music. She is known for her work as a producer for Water Drums, an Ancestral Encounter which explored how African musical influences appear in Venezuelan music.  she was in production for Teresita y El Piano, a documentary of the life of Teresa Carreño. Her productions have appeared in several international film festivals and academic institutions. In addition she works to promote cultural outreach through her films, both within Venezuela and internationally.

Early life and education 
Andreina Gómez was born in Caracas, Venezuela. She obtained her Bachelor degree in Political Sciences at the University of the Andes (Venezuela) in 2005 and Masters in Ethnology at the same institution in 2010. She has also studied screen and script writing workshops from the GUIONARTE Creativity School in Argentina in 2013 and Escuela Internacional de Cine y Televisión San Antonio de los Baños, Cuba from 2011–2012, pitching from Centro Nacional Autónomo de Cinematografía in 2010, and animation at Casa América in 2009.

Career 
Gómez has worked as a producer for two feature films and five television series, totaling 37 documentaries, in her career in film. Her work often takes on international themes, with filming taking place in Venezuela, Colombia, Cuba, and Cameroon. Funding for her projects comes from diverse sources, including the Centro Nacional Autónomo de Cinematografía (CNAC) at national and international level. Her productions have been shown at international film festivals such as Berlin International Film Festival in Germany, Le Marché du Film - Cannes Film Festival in France, BAFICI Film Market in Argentina, Guadalajara International Film Festival Market in Mexico, Documentary Markets DocMontevideo in Uruguay, and Ventana Sur-Buenos in Argentina.

Her first feature film, Water Drums, an Ancestral Encounter (2008), directed by Clarissa Duque, she acted as a producer at the executive, general, field, and ethnological level. She led efforts to organize filming in Venezuela and Cameroon with CNAC, Venezuela, providing major production support. At its debut in Mali, the Ambassador of Venezuela to Mali, Jhony Balza Arismendi, commented that the movie more than reflected the African influence on Venezuelan art and culture; it represented how these cultural ties survived colonial influences that attempted to break down those roots.

In her second feature film, Ajíla, directed by Miguel Guédez, she also produced at the executive, general, and field level the documentary. Ajíla was shot in the Venezuelan Llanos in 2010 and funded by the CNAC, Venezuela, as well.

Her most recent work, Macanao: Footprints in Time, was a four-part documentary miniseries funded by the Venezuelan digital of the People's Ministry for Higher Education, Science and Technology-Venezuela: ConCienciaTV. She researched authorship, contributed to the script, and directed. It first aired in March 2016.

As of 2015, she was working on her debut feature film as a director, Teresita y El Piano. This documentary traces the life and music of the Venezuelan pianist and composer, Teresa Carreño, through her life in Venezuela, Cuba, the United States, France, the United Kingdom, and Germany. Towards this effort, she has received funding from Ibero-American Cinema IBERMEDIA. This project has also been selected in the major development clinics at the Talent Campus, 2012, Berlinale (Berlinale Talents), Sundance Institute 2014 and a Summer of 2014 Guide. Her company, Salinas Producciones, organized and put on a concert showcasing the music of Teresa Carreño at the theatre Teresa Carreño, located in Caracas, in July 2016.

In addition, she works as coordinator of projects and audiovisual campaigns in a Venezuelan-German International NGO, Fundation Humanit'as, sponsored by the United Nations and has founder her own production company, Salinas Producciones C.A. located in Nueva Esparta State.

Filmography 
 Water Drums, an Ancestral Encounter, Feature film, 2008
 Saber Rural, Television series, 2009
 Ajila, Feature film, 2010
 Luisa Cáceres: La heróina de la Resistencia, Animation for television, 2012
 Paraguachoa, Resiste II Parte, Television series, 2013–2014
 Guárama, Television Series, 2014
 Macanao, Footsteps in Time, Television series, 2015

References

External links
Official website
 Teresita y El Piano

1981 births
Living people
Venezuelan film producers
Women ethnologists